Camille Ngakosso is a former manager of the Congo national football team.

References 

Republic of the Congo football managers
Congo national football team managers